Hiepia is a monotypic genus of flowering plants belonging to the family Apocynaceae. The only species is Hiepia corymbosa .

It is native and found in Vietnam.

The genus name of Hiepia is in honour of Tiên Hiêp Nguyên (b. 1947), a Vietnamese botanist, who organized field research excursions in south-east Asia.
The Latin specific epithet of corymbosa refers to Corymb,  which is derived from the Ancient Greek word korymbos meaning "bunch of flowers or fruit". Hiepia and Hiepia corymbosa were first described and published in Turczaninowia Vol.14, Issue 3 on page 6 in 2011.

References

Apocynaceae
Monotypic Apocynaceae genera
Plants described in 2011
Flora of Vietnam